The Unified Socialist Party, officially called Unified PSI–PSDI (PSI–PSDI Unificati), was the name of the federation of parties formed by the Italian Socialist Party (PSI) and the Italian Democratic Socialist Party (PSDI) from 1966 to 1969. The parties membership was composed of 700,964 activists in 1966.

History
The two parties joined forces in 1966, after the PSI had joined the Italian government in 1963 for the first time since 1947, as part of Aldo Moro's cabinets, composed of Christian Democracy, the Italian Republican Party and the PSDI. The united party achieved just 14.5% of the vote in the 1968 Italian general election, due to the competition of the PSI's dissidents of the Italian Socialist Party of Proletarian Unity, the PSI–PSDI returned officially to the name PSI in October 1968, causing the split of the PSDI's former members in July 1969: these formed the United Socialist Party, which was finally renamed PSDI in 1971.

Composition

Electoral results

Italian Parliament

Sources

1966 establishments in Italy
1971 disestablishments in Italy
Defunct political party alliances in Italy
Defunct social democratic parties in Italy
Political parties disestablished in 1971
Political parties established in 1966